Dragan Čadikovski (born 13 January 1982) is a Serbian-born Macedonian former professional footballer who played as a striker. He also holds Slovenian citizenship.

Club career
After starting out at Kolubara, Čadikovski moved abroad to Slovenia and joined Publikum Celje in the summer of 2001. He spent three and a half seasons at the club, scoring 22 league goals and earning a transfer to Russian club Zenit Saint Petersburg in the 2004–05 winter transfer window.

In January 2008, Čadikovski returned to his country of birth and signed a three-year contract with Partizan. He helped the team win the double in the remainder of the season. A year after joining Partizan, Čadikovski was transferred to K League side Incheon United.

International career
He made his senior debut for Macedonia in a January 2004 friendly match away against China and has earned a total of 8 caps, scoring no goals. His final international was a February 2005 FIFA World Cup qualification match against Andorra in Skopje.

Coaching career
On 13 January 2020, Čadikovski announced his retirement from professional football. Čadikovski, however, continued for FK Kolubara as a youth coach and assistant coach of the clubs first team. During 2020, he also played matches with FK TEK Sloga.

Statistics

Honours
Partizan
 Serbian SuperLiga: 2007–08
 Serbian Cup: 2007–08

References

External links

 
 
 
 

1982 births
Living people
Footballers from Belgrade
Serbian people of Macedonian descent
Association football forwards
Macedonian footballers
North Macedonia international footballers
NK Celje players
FC Zenit Saint Petersburg players
NK Maribor players
FK Partizan players
Incheon United FC players
NK Rudar Velenje players
NK Olimpija Ljubljana (2005) players
FC Koper players
NK Domžale players
FK Radnički 1923 players
FK Kolubara players
FK Velež Mostar players
Slovenian PrvaLiga players
Russian Premier League players
Serbian SuperLiga players
K League 1 players
Premier League of Bosnia and Herzegovina players
Serbian First League players
Macedonian expatriate footballers
Expatriate footballers in Slovenia
Macedonian expatriate sportspeople in Slovenia
Expatriate footballers in Russia
Macedonian expatriate sportspeople in Russia
Expatriate footballers in South Korea
Macedonian expatriate sportspeople in South Korea
Expatriate footballers in Bosnia and Herzegovina
Macedonian expatriate sportspeople in Bosnia and Herzegovina
Expatriate footballers in Austria
Macedonian expatriate sportspeople in Austria